Goslarite  is a hydrated zinc sulfate mineral which was first found in the Rammelsberg mine, Goslar, Harz, Germany. It was described in 1847. Goslarite belongs to the epsomite group which also includes epsomite and morenosite. Goslarite is an unstable mineral at the surface and will dehydrate to other minerals like bianchite, boyleite and gunningite.

Physical properties
The composition of goslarite was determined by the US National Bureau of Standards (now the National Institute of Standards and Technology) in 1959 as follows: SO3 27.84 wt%, ZnO 28.30 wt% and  43.86 wt%.

Goslarite's cleavage is perfect in {010}, as for epsomite and morenosite. The color of goslarite ranges from brownish to  pinkish, blue, brown, colorless, green and green blue. The luster ranges from vitreous to nacreous and silky (if fibrous). Goslarite is soluble in water, has an astringent taste, and is strongly diamagnetic.

Geologic occurrence
Goslarite is formed from the oxidation of sphalerite ((Zn, Fe)S). It was first found in Rammelsberg mine, Goslar, Harz, Germany. It often occurs as an efflorescence on timbers and walls of mine passages.   Goslarite is widespread as a post mining efflorescence in mines that contain sphalerite or any zinc minerals.

Economical uses
In the pharmaceutical industry it is used as a direct emetic, antiseptic and disinfectant.

References

External links
Mineral Picture

Zinc minerals
Sulfate minerals
Orthorhombic minerals
Minerals in space group 19
Minerals described in 1847